"Do You Remember the First Time?" is the 7th episode of the sixth season of the American series The Vampire Diaries and the series' 118th episode overall. "Do You Remember the First Time?" was originally aired on November 13, 2014, on The CW. The episode was written by Rebecca Sonnenshine and directed by Darren Genet.

Plot
More drama takes place with a missing Tripp Cooke, Sheriff Forbes is threatened. Caroline and Stefan, although not very friendly with each other at the moment, go to get her back. After everyone continues to convince Elena that she had once loved Damon, she decides to run through the magic free, Mystic Falls border. So she does, getting glimpses of her and Damon but never fully remembering yet that she loves him. Damon pulls her back across the line and she asks about a kiss in the rain. He continues to try to get her to remember.

Feature music 
In the episode "Do You Remember the First Time?" we can hear the songs:
"Another Love" by Tom Odell
"The Hardest Part" by Nina Nesbitt
"MSK" by Yellowcard
"Belong" by Cary Brothers
"Two Weeks" by Grizzly Bear
”Budapest” by George Ezra

Reception

Ratings
In its original American broadcast, "Do You Remember the First Time?" was watched by 1.54 million; slightly down by 0.05 from the previous episode.

Reviews
"Do You Remember the First Time?" received positive reviews.

Stephanie Flasher from TV After Dark gave a B+ rating to the episode saying that it was a nice one, especially for the fans of Damon and Elena. "Bittersweet trip down the couple's history and an epic rain kiss. Finally, Caroline and Stefan have the feelings conversation and Alaric gets his groove back now that he's a human again. And the music was good."

Rebecca Jane Stokes of Den of Geek rated the episode with 4/5 saying that it was a sweet episode and that Stefan finally found out about Caroline's feelings. "The show did what it does best this week. It married romance and longing with the deliberate if piecemeal doling out of key plot points."

Ashley Dominique from Geeked Out Nation rated the episode with 7.9/10 saying that the episode "forced Damon and Elena to explore the new status of their relationship in another slow drawn out episode. However, it was made interesting by not relying on flashbacks, but let them be in the moment."

Sara Ditta of Next Projection rated the episode with 7.2/10 saying that the episode "satisfied because of its tempered tone. The drama wasn’t taken overboard, and viewers could relate to each of our main characters who tried to grasp on to friendships and relationships that had already fallen apart."

Leigh Raines from TV Fanatic rated the episode with 3.5. "All in all, a decent episode, with minor developments but not enough."

Caroline Preece of Den of Geek gave a good review to the episode saying that the show has improved greatly since it stopped paying attention only to Damon and Elena's relationship. "The Damon/Elena storyline is still a frustrating mess, but it’s also not the only thing on the show anymore – and that gives viewers no longer interested in Elena’s love life a reason to come back. Just that simple thing is what fans have been asking for and, now that we have it, it’s glorious."

Lindsay Sperling from We Got This Covered gave a mixed review to the episode saying that this episode was the first filler one for season six. "This season of The Vampire Diaries is arguably already better than the last two combined, but there’s a limit to the amount of Elena and Damon drama that fans should have to endure. Either let them be together, or let them move on. [...] There were a few notable plot twists in [the episode] despite the overwhelming feeling that nothing really happened to move the story along."

References

External links
 
 

2014 American television episodes
The Vampire Diaries (season 6) episodes